Chintoor or Chinturu is a mandal in Alluri Sitharama Raju district of the Indian state Andhra Pradesh. It is located in Rampachodavaram revenue division.

Geography
Geo Coordinates: 17° 44' N 81° 23' E. Chinturu is situated besides river Sabari. Sabari is sub river of Godavari river.

References

Mandals in Alluri Sitharama Raju district